The 1973 NAIA World Series was the 17th annual tournament hosted by the National Association of Intercollegiate Athletics to determine the national champion of baseball among its member colleges and universities in the United States and Canada.

The tournament was played at Phoenix Municipal Stadium in Phoenix, Arizona.

United States International (36-8) defeated Eastern Connecticut State (31-8) in the first game of the championship series, 7–2, to win the Gulls' first NAIA World Series.

US International pitcher Ken Koske was named tournament MVP.

Bracket

See also
 1973 NCAA University Division baseball tournament
 1973 NCAA College Division baseball tournament

Reference

NAIA World Series
NAIA World Series
NAIA World Series